Awake is the third album by Julian Marley, released in 2009 on Tuff Gong. Awake was chosen as "best album of the year" in the International Reggae and World Music Awards in New York. It was nominated for "best reggae album" in the Grammy Awards.

Track listing 
All songs written by Julian Marley
 Awake - 4:41
 Boom Draw - 5:40
 On the Floor - 4:25
 Rosehall - 4:00
 A Little Too Late (featuring Stephen Marley) - 5:00
 Just in Time - 3:45
 Jah Works - 3:19
 Oh Girl (featuring Mr. Cheeks) - 3:42
 Violence in the Streets (featuring Damian "Jr. Gong" Marley) - 5:01
 All I Know - 3:51
 Stay with Me - 4:24
 Sharp as a Razor - 4:05
 Things Ain't Cool - 3:54
 Trying - 4:11

References 

2009 albums
Julian Marley albums
Tuff Gong albums